Sharada Dwivedi (शारदा द्विवेदी),( 1942 – 6 February 2012) was an Indian author, historian and researcher. She wrote several books on the history and culture of both India and Mumbai (formerly Bombay). She was on the panel on the Mumbai Heritage Conservation Committee. Among her most famous work was Bombay, the Cities Within (1995). She had great fascination for Victorian-era Mumbai and later in her life, she developed a great affection for the city's art deco stylings.

Education
Sharada Dwivedi completed her schooling at Queen Mary School, Mumbai, in Mumbai, and then graduated from the Sydenham College of Commerce and Economics from the University of Mumbai. She follow this with a degree in Library Science from the same university and with training in reference work in Paris.

Conservation work
Dwivedi was involved in several conservation projects in Mumbai and served as a member of the Mumbai Heritage Conservation Committee. She was a member of the Executive Committee of the Urban Design Research Institute the KALA GHODA ASSOCIATION, and was a consultant to the Bombay Collaborative. In the early 1990s disgruntled with how authors were not being paid equitably, she started her own publishing company, Eminence Designs Pvt. Ltd. which has gone on to publish over 30 titles on a variety of subjects from Bombay history, art and architecture to cookery, beauty and film. Her book Almond Eyes & Lotus Feet, authored with Shalini Devi Holkar, was subsequently published by Harper Collins in the US.

Death
Dwivedi died on 6 February 2012 in Mumbai, India after a brief illness.

Bibliography
Dwivedi's writings covered subjects such as art, architecture, interiors, heritage, conservation and the traditions of cuisine and beauty.

Dwivedi wrote numerous articles on conservation and urban issues on Mumbai. Among these were:
 Lives of the Indian Princes (1984) with Charles Allen
 Reach for the Stars (1993) – the corporate history of Blue Star Ltd
 The Broken Flute (1994) – a children's novel
 The Maharaja (1999)
 A Celebration of Style (2000) Abu Jani & Sandeep Khosla.

See also 

 Women in the art history field

References

External links
 Youtube of  An Interview with Sharada dwivedi-part-2

 Scientists from Mumbai
 Indian women historians
20th-century Indian historians
 Year of birth missing
 University of Mumbai alumni
2012 deaths
20th-century Indian women scientists
20th-century Indian scientists
20th-century Indian women writers
20th-century Indian writers
 Indian art historians
 Women art historians
 Women writers from Maharashtra
 Educators from Maharashtra
 Women educators from Maharashtra